Granda is a district (parroquia rural) of the municipality of Gijón / Xixón, in Asturias, Spain.

Its population was 661 in 2012.

Granda is a residential and rural area, bordering with the city district in the north and with Vega in the south.

Villages and their neighbourhoods
Granda de Baxo
La Barniella
La Folguera
Granda de Riba
La Belga
La Carbayera
El Foru
La Perdiz
Vaones

External links
 Official Toponyms - Principality of Asturias website.
 Official Toponyms: Laws - BOPA Nº 229 - Martes, 3 de octubre de 2006 & DECRETO 105/2006, de 20 de septiembre, por el que se determinan los topónimos oficiales del concejo de Gijón.

Parishes in Gijón